A series of manuscript prophecies concerning the Papacy, under the title of Vaticinia de Summis Pontificibus, a Latin text which assembles portraits of popes and prophecies related to them, circulated from the late thirteenth-early fourteenth century, with prophecies concerning popes from Pope Nicholas III onwards.

Introduction 
The series of some thirty prophecies, based on Greek prototypes, was "most probably conceived in order to influence one of the ongoing papal elections," written in opposition to the Orsini and their candidates.

The mystical series of prophecies, known from their incipit as the Genus nequam prophecies ("the origin of evil"), are derived from the Byzantine Leo Oracles, a series of twelfth-century Byzantine prophecies that foretell a savior-emperor destined to restore unity to the Christian Empire. Their poems and tempera illuminations mix fantasy, the occult, and chronicle in a chronology of the popes. Each prophecy consists of four elements, an enigmatic allegorical text, an emblematic picture, a motto, and an attribution to a pope.

The series was augmented in the fourteenth century with further prophecies, with the incipit Ascende calve ("arise, bald one"), written in imitative continuation of the earlier set, but with more overtly propagandist aims. By the time of the Council of Constance (1414–18), both series were united  as the Vaticinia de summis pontificibus and misattributed to the Calabrian mystic Joachim of Flora, thus credited to a pseudo-Joachim. There are some fifty manuscripts of this fuller collection.

The prophecies received numerous printed editions.

See also 
 Prophecy of the Popes
 Vaticinia Nostradami
 The Prophesying Nun of Dresden

Notes

References
Fleming, Martha H. The Late Medieval Pope Prophecies: The Genus nequam Group (Series "Medieval and Renaissance Texts and Studies', 204), (Tempe: universidad de Arizona) 1999.
Reeves, Marjorie. Joachim of Fiore and the Prophetic Future, London, SPCK, 1976.  
Reeves, Marjorie. Joachim of Fiore and the Prophetic Future (Paperback). London, Sutton, 1999.  
Reeves, Marjorie. The Influence of Prophecy in the Later Middle Ages: A Study in Joachimism, Oxford University Press, 1969. .
Reeves, Marjorie, Some Popular Prophecies from the Fourteenth to the Seventeenth Centuries, Studies in Church History 8 (1971): 107–34.

External links
 Stiftsbibliothek Kremsmünster: Vaticinia Pontificum 
 Poets, Saints, and Visionaries of the Great Schism: 1378-1417 by Renate Blumenfeld-Kosinsk
 (University of Zurich) Frank Schleich, "Ascende calve: the later series of the medieval pope prophecies"
 Full text of "The late medieval Pope prophecies : the Genus nequam group"
 Images taken from several versions of V.d.S.P. located in libraries around the world
 There was a highly sold version of Vaticinia de Summis Pontificibus, printed in black and white] in 1589 in Venice, with double Italian/Latin texts. A scanned copy of this is available at Internet Archive. There is a copy in the University of London library

Prophecy in Christianity
Christian apocalyptic writings
13th-century Christian texts
13th-century books